TAN (formerly ; acronym for To All Nations) is a South Korean boy group formed through the MBC survival competition show Extreme Debut: Wild Idol. The group is composed of seven members: Changsun, Taehoon, Jiseong, Sunghyuk, Jaejun, Hyunyeop, and Jooan. The group debuted on March 10, 2022, with their debut extended play, 1TAN.

History

Pre-debut: The Wild Idol and several performances
TAN was formed through the survival competition show The Wild Idol, which was aired from September 17, 2021, until December 16, 2021. Out of initially forty-five contestants, only the top seven would be included in the final debut lineup.

Prior to appearing on the program, most of the members had already been active in the entertainment industry. Lee Jae-jun debuted in 2012 as a member of C-Clown under the stage name Maru, until the group disbanded in 2015. He then debuted with TREI in 2019, which later disbanded the next year and made his debut once again as one half of the duo JT&Marcus in 2021. Lee Chang-sun joined 24K in 2016. They were both contestants in Mix Nine, but neither of them made the final lineup; the latter was eliminated in the first round, placing at 105th overall, while the former was eliminated in the final round. After finished at 31st place in Produce 101 Season 2, Seo Sung-hyuk made his debut in project group Rainz in 2017 until the group conclude its activities a year later. Im Joo-an debuted with We in the Zone in 2019 until the group disbanded in 2021. Bang Tae-hoon briefly appeared in Cap-Teen. Kim Ji-seong is a member of NTX, they debuted in early 2021.

On December 29, 2021, TAN had their first live stage performance with the song "Diving to the Top" on 2021 MBC Entertainment Awards. Two days later, they performed "Last Chance" on MBC Gayo Daejejeon. TAN performed the song once again on their first music show broadcast on MBC's Show! Music Core on January 8, 2022. They then had their first busking at Taebaek Gowon Gymnasium on January 16.

2022: Debut with 1TAN, 2TAN, Dream & Deurim, and overseas promotions 
On February 28, 2022, Think Entertainment released a promotional timetable announcing TAN's debut with their first extended play 1TAN on March 10. As per the planned date, the EP with the lead single "Du Du Du" and its music video was released. TAN also had a debut showcase at Yonsei University's Centennial Hall on the same day. The following day, Think Entertainment announced that Jaejun will be a special host on Show! Music Core for two weeks starting on February 12. On the same day, TAN had their debut stage on KBS2's Music Bank.

On May 22, TAN had their second busking at Pohang Space Walk. After performing, they announced that they would make a comeback in June and spoiled parts of the new song. On June 21, TAN released the first part of their second extended play 2TAN with its lead single "Louder".  On July 26, TAN released the second part of 2TAN with its lead single "Walking On The Moon". On August 4, the group's name was changed from TAN (pronounced tan) to TAN (pronounced T.A.N.). They held their first ever showcase on Japan at Toyos PIT, Tokyo, and BIGCAT Live House, Osaka, on September 7 and 9, respectively.

On October 11, TAN released their first single album Dream & Deurim with the lead single "Beautiful Lie". On November 4, they had a fan meeting on Manila. They also had guest appearances on some television shows, such as ABS-CBN's It's Showtime. On November 26, they performed at the "1er Festival Coreano en República Dominicana (1st Korean Festival in the Dominican Republic)". A month later, on December 18 and 24, they held another fan meeting on Japan at Knowledge Theater, Osaka, and TFT Hall 500, Tokyo.

2023: Essege 
On February 23, 2023, Think Entertainment released a promotional timetable revealing their next release, a special single album for their first anniversary titled Essege, which will be released on March 10. The single album's name came from the combining of the words "Essay" and "Message".

Members 
 Changsun
 Jooan
 Jaejun
 Sunghyuk
 Hyunyeop
 Taehoon
 Jiseong

Discography

Extended plays

Single albums

Singles

Other charted songs

Filmography

Television shows

Web shows

Ambassadorship 
 Ambassador for Untangodo 1330 (2022)

Awards and nominations

Notes

References 

K-pop music groups
2021 establishments in South Korea
Musical groups established in 2021
Musical groups from Seoul
Singing talent show winners
South Korean boy bands
South Korean dance music groups
South Korean pop music groups